Visa requirements for Iraqi citizens are administrative entry restrictions by the authorities of other states placed on citizens of Iraq. As of January 2023, Iraqi citizens had visa free, visa on arrival or eVisa access to 29 countries and territories, ranking the Iraqi passport 107th in the world in terms of travel freedom according to the Henley Passport Index.
Visa cancellation between Iran and Iraq came into force on October 26, 2021

Visa requirements map

Visa requirements

Non-visa restrictions

See also

 Visa policy of Iraq
 Iraqi passport
 Foreign relations of Iraq

References and Notes
References

Notes

Iraq
Foreign relations of Iraq